Nebraska Highway 46 is a highway in Nebraska. It has a southern terminus at Nebraska Highway 89 west of Stamford. It has a northern terminus at U.S. Highway 6 and U.S. Highway 34 north of Oxford.

Route description
Nebraska Highway 46 begins at Nebraska Highway 89 west of Stamford.  It goes north and meets U.S. Highway 136 in Oxford.  They overlap through Oxford and separate on the eastern edge of Oxford.  After a brief northwesterly section, the highway turns north at the Furnas County/Harlan County border and ends when it meets U.S. 6 and U.S. 34 north of Oxford.

Major intersections

References

External links

Nebraska Roads: NE 41-60

046
Transportation in Furnas County, Nebraska
Transportation in Harlan County, Nebraska